Gowdin Rural District is a rural district (dehestan) in the Central District of Kangavar County, Kermanshah Province, Iran. At the 2006 census, its population was 12,797, in 3,207 families. The rural district has 20 villages.

References 

Rural Districts of Kermanshah Province
Kangavar County